The Canadian Folk Music Award for Contemporary Album of the Year is an annual music award, presented by the Canadian Folk Music Awards to honour the best albums in contemporary folk music by Canadian artists.

2000s

2010s

2020s

References

Contemporary Album